Universal Rocket Module (URM) is the name of the modular liquid fuelled first and second stage of the Angara expendable launch system. The first stage and booster variant is referred to as URM-1, while the second stage is referred to as URM-2. The URM-2 is derived from the Soyuz-2 Block I second stage.

URM-1 is a unitary structure 2.9 meters in diameter and 25 meters in length that includes an oxidizer tank, a fuel tank (both tanks being coupled by a spacer) and an RD-191 engine burning RP-1 fuel with liquid oxygen producing a thrust of 1.92 MN. URM-1 was first flown in 2014 on the Angara 1.2PP suborbital test flight. Angara can fly with either one URM-1 in the case of Angara 1.2 and Angara 1.2PP, or one URM-1 as a sustainer core with four additional URM-1s as boosters for Angara A5.

URM-2 is a modified Block I stage, 3.6 meters in diameter and 6.9 meters in length. It is powered by a single RD-0124A producing 294 kilonewtons, derived from Block I's RD-0124. URM-2 was first flight tested on Angara 1.2PP, but will fly in operation only on the Angara A5. The operational Angara 1.2 will also use a modified Block I powered by the RD-0124A as a second stage, though this stage will have a diameter of no more than 2.9 meters.

The Naro-1 launch vehicle was based on the URM-1 with a reduced thrust RD-191, called RD-151, combined with a solid-fueled second stage built by 
Republic of Korea KARI.

See also
 Universal Rocket 
 Angara rocket family
 Liquid rocket booster
 Common Core Booster, similar concept for Atlas V
 Common Booster Core, similar concept for Delta IV

External links
 Angara page by Khrunichev Space Center (Archived, Russian)
 Angara page on RussianSpaceWeb

Notes

Rocket components
Rocket propulsion